Mor Yulios Elias is the Metropolitan of Highrange (Adimali) region, Angamali Diocese of Malankara Jacobite Syriac Orthodox Church. This diocese covers regions of Angamali diocese falling in Idukki district. Mor Yulios Elias was consecrated metropolitan on 2 January 2012.

Music albums
Mor Julius Elias worked on various devotional musical albums including Logama Gambeera song was featured in Krushumai Naadhan

References 

1971 births
Living people
Syriac Orthodox Church bishops
Indian Oriental Orthodox Christians